Richard Chapman Weldon (January 19, 1849 – November 26, 1925) was a Canadian professor, lawyer and political figure in Nova Scotia and New Brunswick. He represented Albert in the House of Commons of Canada from 1887 to 1896 as a Conservative member.

Early life and education
He was born in Sussex, New Brunswick, the son of Richard Chapman Weldon and Catherine Geldart. He was educated at Mount Allison Wesleyan College and taught school for two years. Weldon returned to Mount Allison, receiving an M.A. in economics. He went on to study at Yale College, where he received a PhD in political science in 1872, and Rupert Charles University in Germany.

Career
In 1875, he returned to Mount Allison as professor of mathematics and political economy. In 1883, he became professor of law at Dalhousie University and helped establish the law school there. In 1884, he was called to the Nova Scotia bar. In 1887, Weldon, who owned property in New Brunswick, was elected to the House of Commons. Weldon married Louisa Frances Hare in 1893 after the death of his first wife. He helped developed legislation which established conditions for extradition of American fugitives in Canada convicted of crimes in the United States, then referred to as the Weldon Act. Weldon was unsuccessful in bids for reelection in 1896, 1900 and 1906.

Death
On November 26, 1925, he died in Dartmouth, Nova Scotia at the age of 76.

Personal life
On July 11, 1877, he married Sarah Maria Tuttle and they remained married until her death in 1892. He then married Louisa Frances Hare on December 28, 1893. His grandson, Richard L. Weldon, was a provincial politician and lawyer.

Awards
Dalhousie Law School established the Weldon Award in 1983 to recognize outstanding accomplishment by a graduate.

Electoral record

References 

Biography at the Dictionary of Canadian Biography Online

1849 births
1925 deaths
Members of the House of Commons of Canada from New Brunswick
Conservative Party of Canada (1867–1942) MPs
Yale College alumni